The Najran conflict was a poorly documented conflict over Najran in the 1930s fought between the Mutawakkilite Kingdom of Yemen and the Kingdom of Hejaz and Nejd.

Historical accounts 
All known details are provided on page 322 of St John Philby's 1955 book Saudi Arabia, which gives the following account:The conflict is also mentioned on page 54 of Nadav Safran's 1988 book Saudi Arabia: The Ceaseless Quest for Security, which gives a similar account, likely based on that of Philby:

Commentary 

In an enquiry in 2017, the Correlates of War project was unable to find any further information, and found that The Times did not contain any mention of such incident. They went on to add the following statement:

See also 

 1931 Saudi–Yemeni border skirmish, a preceding Saudi–Yemeni conflict
 Saudi–Yemeni War (1934), a subsequent Saudi–Yemeni conflict

References 

Conflicts in 1932
Wars involving Saudi Arabia
Wars involving Yemen
1932 in Saudi Arabia
Saudi Arabia–Yemen military relations
Kingdom of Yemen